The Marquis Pierre Guillaume Imperiali des Princes de Francavilla (17 May 1874 – 10 January 1940) was a Belgian politician. As a member of the Catholic Party, he served as a member of the parliament (1912–1919), and later senator. He is known as the creator of the Imperiali quota voting method.

1874 births
1940 deaths
Belgian politicians